Jasienica  is a village in the administrative district of Gmina Ostrów Mazowiecka, within Ostrów Mazowiecka County, Masovian Voivodeship, in east-central Poland.

References

Villages in Ostrów Mazowiecka County
Łomża Governorate
Białystok Voivodeship (1919–1939)
Warsaw Voivodeship (1919–1939)
Belastok Region